Karbala Northeast Airport, also known as "Imam Hussein International Airport", is a regional airport under development in the Karbala Governorate of Iraq. It is located to the northeast of the city of Karbala.

History
It is a former Iraqi Air Force auxiliary airfield consisting of a  runway and a small aircraft parking ramp. It was apparently abandoned after the 1991 Gulf War and was seized by U.S.-led Coalition forces during Operation Iraqi Freedom in March 2003.

Aerial imagery shows that the runway has been resurfaced; however, the airport has not yet registered with the International Air Transport Association (IATA) nor does it have aircraft on its parking ramp.

See also 
 Imam Husayn ibn Ali
 Abbas ibn Ali
 List of airports in Iraq

References

External links
 Imamhussein.org: KNEA

Airports in Iraq
Karbala Governorate